Eight ships of the Royal Navy have borne the name HMS Union:

  was a fifth rate of unknown origin, possibly a hired vessel.  She was burnt in 1693 to avoid being captured by the French.
 HMS Union was a 90-gun second rate, previously named .  She was renamed HMS Union in 1709, was rebuilt in 1726 and broken up in 1749.
  was a 90-gun second rate launched in 1756. She was converted into a hospital ship in 1799 and was renamed HMS Sussex in 1802.  She was broken up in 1816.
  was a 3-gun gunvessel purchased in 1794 and listed until 1798.
  was a cutter in service in 1806 and broken up in 1810.
  was a 98-gun second rate launched in 1811 and broken up in 1833.
  was the mercantile City of Kingston that the Navy purchased in 1823 for service as a 3-gun schooner; she was wrecked in 1828.
  was a U-class submarine launched in 1940 and sunk in 1941.

Royal Navy ship names